East Lampung Regency is a regency (kabupaten) of Lampung Province, Sumatra, Indonesia. It has an area of 5,325.03 km2 and a population of 951,639 people at the 2010 census and 1,110,340 at the 2020 census. The regency seat is at the town of Sukadana.

It contains the Way Kambas National Park and Satwa Elephant Eco Lodge.

History
In 1989, the Islamist civilians in Talangsari village of East Lampung Regency were massacred by Indonesian Army troops, in an event known as Talangsari incident.

In January 2010 an outbreak of bird flu occurred in East Lampung Regency.

Administrative districts
East Lampung Regency is divided into twenty-four administrative districts (kecamatan), tabulated below  with their areas and their populations at the 2010 census and the 2020 census. They are grouped for convenience into three geographical zones which have no administrative significance. The table also includes the locations of the district administrative centres, the number of administrative villages (rural desa and urban kelurahan) in each district and its post code.

Notes: (a) including 3 offshore islands - Pulau Gosongsekopong, Pulau Segama Besar and Pulau Segama Kecil. (b) formerly Purbolinggo Utara (or North Purbolinggo).

References

 
Regencies of Lampung